The Allakh-Yun (Aallaax Üün) is a river in Sakha Republic and Khabarovsk Krai, Russia. It is a right tributary of the Aldan.

Geography
It flows generally in a south-westerly direction through a narrow valley along the Yudoma-Maya Highlands, to the east of the Sette-Daban range.

The Allakh-Yun freezes over from mid-October until late May.

Local economy and infrastructure
The river is navigable on its lower and middle sections.  The surrounding area is very sparsely settled, with the few settlements that do exist on the river, such as Allakh-Yun, Zvyodochka and Solnechny, having originated as gold-mining centres in the 1930s.  With the economic crisis arising after the breakup of the Soviet Union and subsequent cessation of mining activities, the area's population dropped from over 8,000 in 1989 to around 1,500 in 2010.

This bridge has been repeatedly destroyed or damaged by floods, most recently in 2008.

See also
List of rivers of Russia

References

External links 
 Article in the Great Soviet Encyclopedia

Rivers of the Sakha Republic
Rivers of Khabarovsk Krai
Suntar-Khayata